Freeme Music is a Nigerian music corporation record label founded by Nigerian investor, music executive and entrepreneur  Michael Ugwu on 22 August 2020. The label is a premium label services arm of Freeme Digital, a distribution company founded in 2013 by Michael Ugwu and headquartered in Lagos. The label is home to recording artists such as Ninety, Pawzz, and affiliated with The Cavemen and Basket Mouth.

History 
On August 4, 2020, Freeme Music announced the official signing of The Cavemen to a License Partnership Deal as part of the company's commitment to partner and support the most promising indigenous talents.

In an interview with Music Business Worldwide, Michael Ugwu revealed plans for new artists and global future stars in Africa, “As the pace around the world picks up for African music, Freeme Music and Freeme+ will be at the forefront of finding new artists and future global stars from the continent and bringing them to worldwide recognition and success.”

Before its official launch in 2021, Freeme Music had partnered with The Cavemen and Basket Mouth for the release and rollout of their debut albums; Roots and Yabasi in August 2020 and November 2020 respectively.

In 2021, Ninety joined Freme Music as the first recording artist having signed a 360 deal with the label.

Majesty Lyn joined the label in 2022 in a licensing deal for her extended play Things on Things.

In 2023, Pawzz became the second artist to join Freeme Music on a 360 deal.

Artists

Current acts

Former acts

Discography

Albums

Singles

Notes

References

External links

Nigerian record labels
Record labels established in 2020
Contemporary R&B record labels
Pop record labels